Jan Řehula (born 15 November 1973) is a  triathlete from the Czech Republic.

Řehula participated in the first Olympic triathlon at the 2000 Summer Olympics. He won the bronze medal with a total time of 1:48:46.64.  His split times were 18:11.89 for the swim, 0:59:13.50 for the cycling, and 0:31:21.25 for the run.

His recent International Triathlon Union rankings include:
 2002 - 146th
 2003 - 93rd

References

Czech male triathletes
Triathletes at the 2000 Summer Olympics
1973 births
Living people
Olympic triathletes of the Czech Republic
Olympic bronze medalists for the Czech Republic
Olympic medalists in triathlon
Medalists at the 2000 Summer Olympics